The 2020 season is RoPS's 7th Veikkausliiga season since their promotion back to the top flight in 2012.

Season Events
On 19 November 2019, RoPS announced the signing of Obed Malolo and Arinse Uade.

On 21 November 2019, Aleksandr Kokko signed a new contract for the 2020 season.

On 4 December 2019, Eetu Muinonen signed a new contract for the 2020 season.

On 10 December 2019, Wato Kuaté returned to RoPS, signing a two year contract.

On 11 December 2019, Youness Rahimi signed a new contract for the 2020 season.

On 18 December 2019, RoPS announced the signing of Raymond Gyasi.

On 10 February, RoPS announced the signing of Martin Kompalla.

On 9 March, RoPS announced the signing of Zurab Tsiskaridze from Al-Jabalain.

On 10 March, RoPS announced the signing of Kalle Katz on loan from HJK, until the end of the season.

On 7 June, RoPS announced the signing of Enoch Banza on loan from HJK, until the end of the season.

On 9 June, RoPS announced the signing of Daniel Carr, who'd last played for Apollon Limassol.

On 15 June, RoPS announced the signing of Matias Niemelä on loan from HJK, until the end of the season.

On 26 June, Wato Kuaté was released by RoPS.

On 31 July, Joonas Vahtera joined on loan from HJK for the remainder of the season.

On 12 August, Martin Kompalla left RoPS by mutual consent, whilst Sammy Ndjock joined the club.

On 15 September, Vesa Tauriainen left his role as Head Coach, with Mikko Mannila being appointed as his replacement on 16 September.

Squad

Transfers

In

 Transfers announced on the above date, being finalised on 1 January 2020.

Loans in

Out

 Transfers announced on the above date, being finalised on 1 January 2020.

Released

Friendlies

Competitions

Veikkausliiga

Regular season

Results summary

Results by matchday

Results

Table

Finnish Cup

Sixth Round

Squad statistics

Appearances and goals

|-
|colspan="14"|Youth team players:
|-
|colspan="14"|Players away from the club on loan:
|-
|colspan="14"|Players who left RoPS during the season:

|}

Goal scorers

Clean sheets

Disciplinary record

Notes

References

2020
RoPS